Gogglebox is a television review programme that was narrated by Caroline Aherne until April 2016 and Craig Cash after that. It features recurring British couples, families and friends sitting in their living rooms watching and commenting on various television series. This is a list of all broadcast episodes. All dates are the first broadcast on Channel 4 in the United Kingdom. There was a "Brexit Special" episode of Gogglebox on 3 August 2016 and on 10 September 2021, an all black cast of Celebrity Gogglebox was featured as part of a “Black To Front” day, in which the aim was to amplify black talent, voices and stories, as part of Channel 4's "ongoing commitment to improve Black representation on- and off-screen". On 11 March 2023, there was a special 90 minute episode, to celebrate the 10 year anniversary of the show, with many previous stars returning for the occasion.

A junior version of the show, called Gogglesprogs, launched with a Christmas Special on Christmas Day 2015, and was followed by six other episodes which began airing from 17 June 2016 until 22 July 2016. On 30 May 2017, another spin-off series titled Vlogglebox was announced. It aired on E4 and featured reactions from 16 to 24-year-olds watching online content on their smartphones, laptops or tablets. In 2019, a celebrity version of Gogglebox was ordered, which returned in 2020 for a second series, a third series in 2021 and a fourth in 2022.

Series overview

Episodes

Series 1 (2013)

Series 2 (2013)

Series 3 (2014)

Series 4 (2014)

Series 5 (2015)

Series 6 (2015)

Series 7 (2016)

Gogglesprogs Series 1 (2016)

Series 8 (2016)

Series 9 (2017)

Gogglesprogs Series 2 (2017)

Vlogglebox Series 1 (2017)

Series 10 (2017)

Series 11 (2018)

Series 12 (2018)

Series 13 (2019)

Celebrity Gogglebox Series 1 (2019)

Series 14 (2019–20)

Series 15 (2020)

Celebrity Gogglebox Series 2 (2020)

Series 16 (2020–21)

Series 17 (2021)

Celebrity Gogglebox Series 3 (2021)

Series 18 (2021–22)

Series 19 (2022)

Celebrity Gogglebox Series 4 (2022)

Series 20 (2022–23)

Series 21 (2023)

References

External links
 
 

Gogglebox